Haloglycomyces albus is a Gram-positive, anaerobic and moderately halophilic species of bacteria from the family of Glycomycetaceae.

References

Bacteria described in 2009
Actinomycetia
Monotypic bacteria genera